Harpalus dissitus is a species of ground beetle in the subfamily Harpalinae. It was described by Antoine in 1931.

References

dissitus
Beetles described in 1931